Selebi can refer to
Jackie Selebi, former national commissioner of the South African Police Service and president of Interpol
Selebi-Phikwe, Botswana, a mining town